The 2003 Cup of China was third event of six in the 2003–04 ISU Grand Prix of Figure Skating. It was held at the Capital Gymnasium in Beijing on November 6–9. Medals were awarded in the disciplines of men's singles, ladies' singles, pair skating, and ice dancing. Skaters earned points toward qualifying for the 2003–04 Grand Prix Final. The compulsory dance was the Yankee Polka.

This was the Cup of China's inaugural year.

Results

Men

Ladies

Pairs

Ice dancing

External links
 2003 Cup of China

Cup Of China, 2003
Cup of China
Cup of China
Sports competitions in Beijing
2000s in Beijing